Purcellville Train Station is a historic railway station located in Purcellville, Loudoun County, Virginia. The station is adjacent to the Washington and Old Dominion Railroad Trail (W&OD Trail).  The Southern Railway constructed the station in 1904. The station is a one-story, rectangular frame building with a hipped roof and deeply overhanging eaves supported by triangular knee braces. It was a station on the Washington and Old Dominion Railway and later, the Washington and Old Dominion Railroad from 1912 until the line closed in 1968, with passenger service ceasing in 1951.

The Purcellville Preservation Association restored the station in 2002. The town of Purcellville maintains the station as a public meeting facility and public restrooms, under the purview of the town's Train Station Steering & Oversight Committee.  A Loudoun visitors center within the station contains a W&OD Railroad historical display and hosts wine-tasting events.  The visitors center is open from noon to 4:00 p.m. on Saturdays and Sundays from late April through October. The National Park Service added the station to the National Register of Historic Places on May 28, 2010.

References

Railway stations on the National Register of Historic Places in Virginia
Railway stations in the United States opened in 1904
National Register of Historic Places in Loudoun County, Virginia
Buildings and structures in Loudoun County, Virginia
Railway stations closed in 1951
Purcellville, Virginia
1904 establishments in Virginia
1951 disestablishments in Virginia